Sanetsch Pass (French: Col du Sanetsch or Col de Sénin) (el. 2242 m) is a high mountain pass in Switzerland across the western Bernese Alps, connecting Gsteig in the canton of Berne and Sion in the canton of Valais. Although a road leads to the pass from Sion and goes further to the Lac de Sanetsch, it can not be completely traversed by car. In the summer season the pass is accessible by PostBus and can also be traversed by cable car. The highest point of the road is at 2,252 metres.

The pass itself is located in Valais 4 km south of the border with Berne. It separates the massif of the Diablerets on the west from the massif of the Wildhorn on the east. The Sanetschhorn and the Arpelistock overlook the pass on the west and east side respectively. The Col du Sanetsch is a popular destination because of the view over the Pennine Alps and the nearby Tsanfleuron Glacier.

See also
 List of highest paved roads in Europe
 List of mountain passes

References

External links 
Profile on climbbybike.com
Cycling: Map, elevation chart, route description and photos
Sanetsch.ch
List of Alpine passes in switzerland

Mountain passes of Valais
Mountain passes of the Alps